née  is a Japanese Go professional.

Biography
Yukari Umezawa was born in Tokyo in 1973, and graduated from Keio University in 1996. She first played Go at the age of 6 and she became a professional Go player in 1996. She then attained the rank of 5-dan in 2002 at the age of 29, and was married in the same year. Umezawa supervised the production of Hikaru no Go, a manga about Go written by Yumi Hotta and illustrated by Takeshi Obata. She also became a consultant for the anime version of Hikaru no Go and hosted Go educational programs on NHK. Umezawa's sensei was Masao Kato. Umezawa is married to Shinya Yoshihara. They have a son (born 2011).

Titles

External links
 Yukari Umezawa's home page
 Sensei's Library's page on Yukari Umezawa
 A webpage about Umezawa at Nihon Ki-in's website
 A Nipponia article about Umezawa
 Yukari Umezawa manga at Media Arts Database 
 Yukari Yoshihara manga at Media Arts Database 
 Yukai Umezawa anime at Media Arts Database 

1973 births
Japanese Go players
Female Go players
Living people
People from Tachikawa
Keio University alumni